The women's triathlon at the 2020 Summer Olympics took place at the Odaiba Marine Park in Tokyo on 27 July 2021.

Over the course of the swimming and cycling legs, a select group of seven leading competitors had formed, including Bermudian Flora Duffy, Briton Georgia Taylor-Brown, and American Katie Zaferes. After distancing herself from Zaferes early on during the running leg, Duffy won the race and became Bermuda's first Olympic gold medalist. Taylor-Brown, who had suffered a puncture late in the cycling leg, passed several competitors during the running leg to finish second, over a minute behind Duffy, and claim the silver medal, while Zaferes hung on to complete the podium and claim the bronze medal.

Course 

Competitors began with a  swimming leg, consisting of a  lap followed by a shorter  lap. Then, they took on the  cycling leg, which covered eight laps of a  course. Finally, competitors finished with four laps of a  course that made up the  running leg. Between each leg, there was also a transition zone in which competitors must change equipment and clothing for the next leg.

Summary 

There were 55 competitors entered into the triathlon, but only 54 started the event; Ukraine's Yuliya Yelistratova did not start after being provisionally suspended. The field included then-reigning world champion Georgia Taylor-Brown of Great Britain, and her three immediate predecessors to that title, 2019 champion Katie Zaferes of the United States, 2018 world champion and compatriot Vicky Holland, and 2016 and 2017 champion Flora Duffy of Bermuda. American Gwen Jorgensen, who won the 2016 Olympic event, was not in the field to defend her title, having retired from the sport to focus on running, but her fellow podium finishers from 2016, silver medalist Holland and bronze medalist Switzerland's Nicola Spirig, both competed.

Heavy rain in the hours before the race delayed the start by at least fifteen minutes, and conditions remained wet during the race. On the first lap of the swimming leg, Jessica Learmonth of Great Britain established the pace. A lead group quickly formed in the water, with Learmonth followed closely by Americans Zaferes and Summer Rappaport, Vittoria Lopes of Brazil, Laura Lindemann of Germany, and Taylor-Brown. At the end of the swimming leg, the lead group of seven had built up an advantage of at least 30 seconds on the rest of the field, which was led out of the water by Emma Jeffcoat of Australia. At the end of the first cycling lap, the leaders' advantage had grown to over a minute ahead of a chase group of 14 that included Spirig, Holland, and the Dutch duo of Maya Kingma and Rachel Klamer. A lack of organization in the chase group left Spirig to lead the chase and reduce the deficit, but with little success. On the next lap, the chase group was reduced to 12, while Rappaport and Lopes were dropped from the lead group on the fourth and sixth laps, respectively. A puncture for Taylor-Brown near the end of the cycling leg saw her cede 20 seconds to the other four leaders heading into the second transition.

Duffy and Zaferes led at the start of the running leg, but by the end of the second lap, the Bermudian began to distance herself. Behind, Taylor-Brown overtook first Lindemann and then Learmonth before passing Zaferes with one lap to go. With a lead of over a minute, Duffy was able to celebrate her victory as she ran down the finishing straight, becoming Bermuda's first Olympic gold medalist. Taylor-Brown and Zaferes both finished over a minute behind Duffy but held on for the silver and bronze medals, respectively, while Lindemann and Learmonth were caught and passed by the faster runners of the chase group.

Results

Notes

References 

Women
Women's events at the 2020 Summer Olympics